My Family Recipe Rocks is a television cooking show hosted by Joey Fatone.  The show is produced for Live Well Network by Executive Producer Jeff Aiello for Fresno, California ABC O&O station KFSN-TV.

The show
In each episode, Host, Joey Fatone visits a different American city to meet someone known in their community for a signature recipe.  He and the show's crew spend a day in the person's kitchen and Fatone helps the cook prepare the recipe for his/her friends and family and share stories and family memories pertaining to the recipe and the cook's family.

Episodes

References

2010s American cooking television series
2012 American television series debuts